Old Stone Tavern may refer to:

 Old Stone Tavern (Little Creek, Delaware)
 Old Stone Tavern (Frankfort, Kentucky)
 Old Stone Tavern (Pittsburgh), Pennsylvania
 Old Stone Tavern (Atkins, Virginia)
 Old Stone Tavern (Moorefield, West Virginia)
 Old Talbott Tavern, in Bardstown, Kentucky